This is a list of members of the National Council of Provinces of the 25th South African Parliament from 2009 to 2014.

Composition

Permanent delegates

References
 

25th South African Parliament